Striononyma is a genus of longhorn beetles of the subfamily Lamiinae, containing the following species:

 Striononyma flavofasciata Breuning, 1960
 Striononyma flavovariegata Breuning, 1960
 Striononyma unicolor Breuning, 1961

References

Desmiphorini